Cilia (Latin for eyelashes; the singular is cilium) in entomology are fine hairs along the edges of the insect wing.

References

Insect morphology